USS LST-982 was an  in the United States Navy. Like many of her class, she was not named and is properly referred to by her hull designation.

Construction
LST-982 was laid down on 22 December 1943, at the Boston Navy Yard; launched on 10 February 1944; sponsored by Mrs. Orrion R. Hewitt; and commissioned on 19 March 1944.

Service history
During World War II, LST-982 was assigned to the European Theater and participated in the invasion of Normandy in June 1944. Transferred to the Asiatic-Pacific Theater, she engaged in the assault and occupation of Okinawa Gunto in May and June 1945.

Following the war, she performed occupation duty in the Far East and saw service in China until mid-April 1946. The ship was decommissioned on 25 April 1946, and struck from the Navy list on 19 July 1946. On 5 December 1947, she was sold to Bosey, Philippines.

LST-982 earned two battle stars for World War II service.

Notes

Citations

Bibliography 

Online resources

External links
 

 

LST-542-class tank landing ships
World War II amphibious warfare vessels of the United States
Ships built in Boston
1944 ships